With Blood Comes Cleansing is an American Christian deathcore band from Albany, Georgia, United States.

History
With Blood Comes Cleansing started in February 2005. After touring, several member changes, and releasing a six-song EP, With Blood Comes Cleansing signed on with Virginia-based Blood & Ink Records in February 2006. That summer they released their first full-length album, Golgotha. Since then, the band has been touring, and recently moved to a bigger record label, Victory Records, in February 2007. They released their second album, Horror, in January 2008, through Victory Records.

On 10 July 2008, With Blood Comes Cleansing decided to stop touring full-time and focus on their personal endeavors. Dean moved to Chicago, Illinois, with his wife, but has recently returned to South Georgia. Dennis, Scott, and Spence are all living in Albany, Georgia. Michael and Jeremy currently live in Atlanta, Georgia. The band continues to play shows whenever possible but has no future plans to make a comeback or release any new records. Michael and Dean will be sharing the responsibility of vocalist.

In November 2022, the band announced they would be reuiniting in 2023 sans Dean as well announcing they had pressed 300 copies of their debut album "Golgotha" on vinyl via Secret Swarm Records which sold out in less than two minutes.

They have been announced to play at Furnace Fest 2023.

Members
Current line-up
Michael Sasser - vocals (2005-2006, 2022-Present)
Scott Erickson – guitar (2005–2010,2022-Present)
Jeremy Sims – guitar (2005–2010,2022-Present)
Michael Crain – bass (2022-Present)
Zach Lewis - drums (2022-present)

Past members
Dean Atkinson - vocals (2005, 2006-2010)
Tyler Holt – guitar (2005–2006)
Spence Erickson – drums (2005–2006)
Greg Titus – bass (2006–2007)
Jon Stripling – bass (2005–2006)
Doug McMillan – bass (2005)
Josh Pearson – guitar (2005)
Darrell Bentley – drums (2005)
Matt Fidler – drums (2006–2010)

Timeline

Discography
Studio albums
 Golgotha (Blood and Ink, 2006)
 Horror (Victory, 2008)

EPs
 The Dern EP (2005)

Demos
 The Last Shall Be the First (2005)

References

External links
With Blood Comes Cleansing on Myspace

Musical groups established in 2005
Musical groups disestablished in 2010
Heavy metal musical groups from Georgia (U.S. state)
American Christian metal musical groups
Victory Records artists
Blood and Ink Records artists
American deathcore musical groups
Musical quintets
Musicians from Albany, Georgia